McGuire House may refer to:

Thomas R. McGuire House, Little Rock, Arkansas, NRHP-listed
McGuire-Setzer House, Mocksville, North Carolina, listed on the National Register of Historic Places (NRHP) in Davie County, North Carolina
McGuire House (Tulsa, Oklahoma), a work of architect John T. Blair

See also
McGuires School, McGuire, Idaho, NRHP-listed
McConnell-McGuire Building, Moscow, Idaho, NRHP-listed